Ski jumping at the 1980 Winter Olympics consisted of two events held from 17 February to 23 February, taking place at Lake Placid Olympic Ski Jumping Complex.

Medal summary

Medal table

Austria led the medal table with one gold and one silver medal. A tie in the normal hill competition meant that two silver and no bronze medals were awarded in that event.

Events

Participating NOCs
Eighteen nations participated in ski jumping at the Lake Placid Games. Bulgaria and Spain made their Olympic ski jumping debuts.

References

 
1980 Winter Olympics events
1980
1980 in ski jumping
Ski jumping competitions in the United States